Milič Čapek, (26 January 1909 – 17 November 1997) was a Czech–American philosopher. Čapek was strongly influenced by the process philosophy of Henri Bergson and to a lesser degree by Alfred North Whitehead. Much of his work was devoted to the relation of philosophy and modern physics, especially the philosophy of space and time and metaphysics.

Life
Čapek was born in the municipality of Třebechovice in present-day Czech Republic (then part of Austria-Hungary).

He was married to Stephanie Čapek (born Štěpánka Řežábková), who was a school teacher in Czechoslovakia and later a housewife, and died on July 14, 1998 (aged 82), in Little Rock, Arkansas. Together they have a daughter, Dr. Stella M. Čapek from Conway, Arkansas.

In 1935 Čapek received his Ph.D. in philosophy at Charles University in Prague. Following the German occupation, he escaped from Czechoslovakia and studied at the Sorbonne in Paris, where he also directed Czech-language broadcasts back to his homeland. Ten days before the Nazi invasion, Čapek left Paris and went to America after an odyssey via Dakar, Casablanca and a Vichy concentration camp in Morocco. During the war he taught physics in the Army Specialized Training Program at the University of Iowa, the V-12 Navy College Training Program at Doan College, and at the University of Nebraska. After the war he returned to Czechoslovakia, where he taught briefly at the Palacký University of Olomouc. One month before the 1948 communist coup d'état he was fleeing once again, to take up permanent residence and citizenship in the United States.

In 1948  joined the Carleton College philosophy faculty. In 1962 he accepted a position as professor of philosophy at Boston University, where he served with distinction until his retirement in 1974. His visiting professorships included the Davis Campus of the University of California, Emory University, University of North Texas, Yale University, and, again, Carleton, as the Donald J. Cowling Distinguished Visiting Professor of Philosophy. In 1983 Čapek was honored by Carleton with a Doctor of Letters degree.

Work
Čapek was the author of numerous articles in scholarly journals as well as of several books. Milič Čapek made major contributions to the understanding of the philosophical implications of relativity theory and quantum mechanics, and to the philosophy of time. He supported a dynamic view of time with real flow and genuine becoming, as opposed to the common block universe view with its static interpretation of time. Čapek stated that the reason why we think of time and space as "space-time" and rather than "time-space" is because we give priority to the spatial aspect in our effort to geometrize events and moments, or to render them "space-like", as Einstein said.

Bibliography

Works by Čapek
 1961. The Philosophical Impact of Contemporary Physics. Van Nostrand, .
 1971. Bergson and Modern Physics: A Re-Interpretation and Re-Evaluation. Boston Studies in the Philosophy of Science, Vol. 7. D. Reidel Publ. Comp.,  (Google Books).
 1976 (edited by M. Čapek). The Concepts of Space and Time: Their Structure and Their Development. D. Reidel Publ. Comp,  (Google Books).
 1977. Immediate and Mediate Memory. Process Studies 7(2): 90-96 (fulltext online).
 1988. Do the New Concepts of Space and Time Require a New Metaphysics? Chapter 6 pp. 90–104 in Kitchener, R. F. (ed.). The World View of Contemporary Physics: Does It Need a New Metaphysics?. SUNY Press, .
 1991. The New Aspects of Time: Its Continuity and Novelties. Boston Studies in the Philosophy of Science. Kluwer Academic, .

Works about Čapek and his thought
 Van Fraassen, Bas C., 1962. Capek on Eternal Recurrence. Journal of Philosophy 59(14): 371-375 (Abstract).
 Lenzen, V. F., 1963. Book Review: Milič Capek. The philosophical impact of contemporary physics. Philosophy of Science 30(1): 81-83.
 Sipfle, David A., 1998. Milič Čapek 1909-1997. Proceedings and Addresses of the American Philosophical Association 71(5): 138.
 Brogaard, Berit, 2000. The Coup de Grâce for Mechanistic Metaphysics: Čapek's New Philosophy of Nature. Transactions of the Charles S. Peirce Society 36(1): 75-108.

See also

Process philosophy
American philosophy
Philosophy of space and time

Notes

External links
, Czechoslovak Society of Arts & Sciences (SVU) Obituaries' Archive (1998–2001)

1909 births
1997 deaths
20th-century American non-fiction writers
20th-century American philosophers
20th-century Czech philosophers
20th-century essayists
American male essayists
American male non-fiction writers
American people of Czech descent
Boston University faculty
Carleton College alumni
Czech essayists
Czech philosophers
Epistemologists
Metaphysicians
Metaphysics writers
Ontologists
Academic staff of Palacký University Olomouc
People from Little Rock, Arkansas
Philosophers of science
Philosophers of time
Process philosophy
20th-century American male writers